Xanthocephalum is a genus of North American plants in the tribe Astereae within the family Asteraceae.

The name "Xanthocephalum" means "yellow head," from the Greek "xanthos," yellow and "kephale," head. The genus was once much larger than it is today, with many of its former members transferred to Gutierrezia in the 1980s.

 Species
 Xanthocephalum amoenum Shinners - Texas
 Xanthocephalum benthamianum Hemsl. - Aguascalientes, San Luis Potosí, Chihuahua, Durango, Michoacán, Jalisco
 Xanthocephalum centauroides Willd. - Michoacán, Durango, D.F., Guanajuato, México State
 Xanthocephalum durangense M.A.Lane - Durango
 Xanthocephalum eradiatum (M.A.Lane) G.L.Nesom - Chihuahua
 Xanthocephalum gymnospermoides (A.Gray) Benth. & Hook.f. - United States (Arizona, Texas), 	Chihuahua, Sonora
 Xanthocephalum humile (Kunth) Benth. & Hook.f. - Hidalgo, D.F., Puebla, Tlaxcala, México State, San Luis Potosí
 Xanthocephalum megalocephalum Fernald - Chihuahua
 formerly included
see Amphiachyris Gutierrezia Gymnosperma Pilosella Stephanodoria

References

Astereae
Asteraceae genera
Flora of North America
Taxa named by Carl Ludwig Willdenow